Paolo Ginestra (born 14 February 1979) is an Italian footballer who plays as a goalkeeper.

He played over 200 games in the Italian lower divisions.

Career
Ginestra started his career at Serie C1 and Serie C2 clubs. He was signed by A.C. Milan in the late 1990s (1999 or 2000). During the 2000–01 season, he was loaned to Castel di Sangro along with Alberto Passoni from A.C. Milan.

He was one of the player that signed by Milan then sold to Internazionale in player exchange, and gained "false profit" by inflated the nominal transfer fees in the 2000s (decade). He was exchanged with Matteo Bogani in 2001 and made both parties "gained" €3.5million, but Ginestra's gain was in terms of registration rights of Bogani, vice versa. Ginestra then loaned out immediately.

During the 2004–05 season, Ginestra remained at Vis Pesaro and met with his Inter "team-mate" Simone Giovanni Brunelli, Wellington and Marco Bonura which Bonura and Brunelli also had an inflated transfer fees sold by Milan.

In June 2005, he was signed by Livorno at Serie A but in last day of transfer windows joined AlbinoLeffe of Serie B on loan, in exchange with Paolo Acerbis, where he compete the first choice with Achille Coser. In mid-2006, he left for Ternana at Serie C1. In August 2007, he signed a new 2+1 contract with club. In February 2009, he last day of transfer windows, the left for Parma at Serie B on loan, as Nicola Pavarini's backup.

During the 2009–10 season, he became the backup of Stefano Visi along with Pasquale Cunzi. On 1 December 2010 he joined Paganese on free transfer, ahead Ugo Gabrieli as first choice.

On 1 July 2011, U.S. Foggia signed Ginestra on free transfer.

In July 2013, he was signed by Fano. He played for Fano also the two following season.

On 7 September 2019, he joined Serie D club San Nicolò.

On 12 December 2019 he returned to Fermana, signing a contract until 30 June 2021.

References

External links
http://aic.football.it/scheda/4297/ginestra-paolo.htm
 
 

1979 births
Living people
People from Pergola, Marche
Sportspeople from the Province of Pesaro and Urbino
Italian footballers
Association football goalkeepers
Serie B players
Serie C players
Lega Pro Seconda Divisione players
Serie D players
Alma Juventus Fano 1906 players
U.S. Triestina Calcio 1918 players
S.S. Maceratese 1922 players
Calcio Lecco 1912 players
A.C. Milan players
A.S.D. Castel di Sangro Calcio players
Inter Milan players
A.C. Prato players
U.S. Sassuolo Calcio players
Vis Pesaro dal 1898 players
U.S. Livorno 1915 players
U.C. AlbinoLeffe players
Ternana Calcio players
Parma Calcio 1913 players
Paganese Calcio 1926 players
Calcio Foggia 1920 players
Forlì F.C. players
Casertana F.C. players
Fermana F.C. players
Footballers from Marche